Michael Burton (born February 1, 1992) is an American football fullback for the Denver Broncos of the National Football League (NFL). He played college football at Rutgers, and was drafted by the Detroit Lions in the fifth round of the 2015 NFL Draft. He has also played for the Chicago Bears, New Orleans Saints, Washington Redskins.

Early years
Burton attended and played high school football at West Morris Central High School in Washington Township, New Jersey.

College career
Burton played college football at Rutgers from 2011 to 2014. In the 2011 season, he had 10 carries for 44 rushing yards to go along with 10 receptions for 68 receiving yards and a receiving touchdown. In the 2012 season, he had three receptions for 34 receiving yards in four games. In the 2013 season, he had 19 receptions for 149 receiving yards and two receiving touchdowns. In his final collegiate season in 2014, he had 15 receptions for 150 receiving yards.

Professional career

Detroit Lions
Burton was drafted by the Detroit Lions in the fifth round (168th overall) of the 2015 NFL Draft.

On May 12, 2015, the Detroit Lions signed Burton to a four-year, $2.46 million contract with a signing bonus of $184,356.

He entered training camp competing with Emil Igwenagu to be the Detroit Lions' starting fullback. He won the job and was named their starting fullback to begin the regular season. He made his professional regular season debut and first career start in the Lions' season-opener against the San Diego Chargers. The next game, Burton had his first career carry for a two-yard gain in a 16–26 loss to the Minnesota Vikings. On October 5, 2015, he made his first career catch on a three-yard pass from Matt Stafford and finished the 10–13 loss to the Seattle Seahawks with one carry for no yards and one catch for three yards. On December 21, 2015, Burton caught his first career touchdown on a four-yard pass from Stafford and finished the 35–27 win over the New Orleans Saints with two receptions for ten yards and one touchdown.

He finished his rookie season with four carries for two rushing yards and six receptions for 39 receiving yards and a touchdown, while starting seven games and appearing in all 16.

Burton entered his second season as the Lions' de facto starter at fullback. Although he appeared in 15 games, he wasn't credited with an official start in any of them and also did not receive any carries or receptions throughout his second year.

On May 30, 2017, Burton was waived by the Lions.

Chicago Bears
Burton was claimed off waivers by the Chicago Bears on May 31, 2017..

On September 10, 2017, in his Bears debut, Burton had one rush for seven yards in the 23–17 home loss to the Atlanta Falcons at Soldier Field. On the 2017 season, he had four carries for nine rushing yards to go along with two receptions for eight receiving yards.

The following season Burton played in eight games with one start, mostly working as a blocking back.

New Orleans Saints
On May 13, 2019, Burton signed with the New Orleans Saints. He was released on August 31, 2019.

Washington Redskins

Burton signed with the Washington Redskins on October 15, 2019.

New Orleans Saints (second stint)
On March 23, 2020, Burton signed a one-year contract with the New Orleans Saints. He was placed on the reserve/COVID-19 list by the team on January 2, 2021, and activated on January 6.

Kansas City Chiefs
Burton signed with the Kansas City Chiefs on April 5, 2021. In the Chiefs week 15 game against the Los Angeles Chargers, he scored his first career rushing touchdown on a seven-yard run.

On March 21, 2022, Burton re-signed with the Chiefs on a one-year deal for an undisclosed amount. Burton won Super Bowl LVII when the Chiefs defeated the Philadelphia Eagles 38-35.

Denver Broncos
On March 17, 2023, the Denver Broncos signed Burton to a one-year contract.

References

External links
Kansas City Chiefs bio
Rutgers Scarlet Knights bio

1992 births
Living people
American football fullbacks
Chicago Bears players
Denver Broncos players
Detroit Lions players
Kansas City Chiefs players
New Orleans Saints players
Washington Redskins players
People from Washington Township, Morris County, New Jersey
Players of American football from New Jersey
Rutgers Scarlet Knights football players
Sportspeople from Morris County, New Jersey
West Morris Central High School alumni